Stenoptilia stigmatodactylus is a moth of the family Pterophoridae. It is found in western, central and Mediterranean Europe, extending into Asia Minor and North Africa. It is also known from Iran, Russia and Armenia.

The wingspan is 17–23 mm.

The larvae feed on Thymus vulgaris, Scabiosa ochroleuca, Scabiosa lucida and Knautia arvensis. They feed on the flowers and seeds. Pupation takes place on the stem of the host plant. The pupa is covered with a loose web.

References

stigmatodactylus
Moths described in 1852
Plume moths of Africa
Plume moths of Asia
Plume moths of Europe
Taxa named by Philipp Christoph Zeller